redBus is an Indian online bus ticketing platform, providing ticket booking facilities through its website and iOS and Android mobile apps. It is headquartered in Bangalore and works like a hub, acting as a medium for a network of more than 2000 bus operators, across the countries of India, Malaysia, Indonesia, Singapore, Peru, and Colombia. It claims to have registered over 180 million trips, with a customer base of over 20 million.

In 2013, redBus was acquired by Ibibo Group.

History
redBus was founded in 2006 by Phanindra Sama, Sudhakar Pasupunuri and Charan Padmaraju, engineers from the Birla Institute of Technology and Science , who also worked together at various organisations before founding the company. In the same year the company was selected for the TiE Entrepreneurship Acceleration Program and was mentored on several aspects of the business. The company owns BOGDS, a cloud computing service for bus operators, and SeatSeller, a GDS for bus inventory distribution.

Operation
In 2014, the company appointed Prakash Sangam as its Chief executive officer, who was earlier the Executive Vice President of Info Edge India (Naukri Group), heading Shiksha.com and Jeevansathi.com. 
In April 2022, redBus appointed Allu Arjun, as its brand ambassador.

Partnership
In 2012, redBus tied-up with Goa State Road Transport to launch an online ticketing portal. In the same year, the company announced a partnership with the Rajasthan State Road Transport Corporation (RSRTC), following which it started offering RSRTC bus tickets on the portal. Early in 2019, redBus partnered with Acko General Insurance to offer travel insurance for its users to cover accidents, baggage loss, cancellation and bus-type mismatch. It also partnered with Truecaller, to offer bus ticket booking on Android devices. redBus afterwards announced a partnership with Google Maps to display information on busses that ply between cities with the time and date services to enhance user experience.

June 2019, redBus started ride sharing operations - rPool, across Bengaluru, Pune and Hyderabad. rPool is an option that helps ride givers to share(pool) their vehicle to fellow ride takers.

On 26 November 2019, redBus partnered with Amazon India to launch a bus ticket booking service on Amazon.

Funding
In 2007, redBus received its first round of funding of $1 million from SeedFund and undisclosed investors. SeedFund had invested $500,000 in the company while other investors accounted for the remaining $500,000 investment.

In 2009, the company raised a funding of a $2.5 million from Inventus Capital Partners, Seed Fund and other unnamed investors.

In 2011, redBus raised another funding of $6.5 million from Helion Venture Partners, Seedfund and Inventus Capital.

In 2013, redBus was acquired by Ibibo Group, a subsidiary of South Africa’s Naspers.

Awards and recognition
 2012: Named as a Fast Company amongst the world's 50 most innovative companies in 2012
 2014: ‘Global Mobile Innovation’ in Travel Award by Eyefortravel
 2014: the Most Innovative Company of the Year award by Business Standard
 2015: ‘The Most Trusted Brand’ by IBC InfoMedia in 2015
 2015: Most trusted brand in the online travel category and the 13th most trusted internet brand in the overall rankings as per the Brand Trust Report, India Study 2015.

See also
 Internet booking engine
 MakeMyTrip
 Ibibo
 Yatra

External links
 
 redRail app

References

Travel ticket search engines
Indian travel websites
Online travel agencies
Indian companies established in 2006
Companies based in Karnataka
2006 establishments in Karnataka